Teebone is an English UK garage/drum and bass producer and DJ, best known for the 2000 hit "Fly Bi" which features the MCs Kie and Sparks.

In the 1990s, Teebone together with DJ Dextrous produced under a number of aliases including Fusion Forum and Regulators, releasing jungle and drum and bass records. In 1994, Teebone founded his label Riddim Track Records. In the late 1990s, he started producing UK garage; his biggest and most well-known track, "Fly Bi", reached No. 43 on the UK Singles Chart and No. 1 on the UK Dance Singles Chart. NME included the song in their "25 essential UK garage anthems" list.

Teebone also produces and directs music videos for other artists; among those are Shy FX and Pendulum ("Slam").

References

External links

Living people
English record producers
Black British DJs
English drum and bass musicians
UK garage musicians
DJs from London
Club DJs
Remixers
Reinforced Records artists
East West Records artists
Electronic dance music DJs
Year of birth missing (living people)